Syer-Tenyer, or Western Karaboro, is a pair of Senufo dialects of Burkina Faso.

References

Karaboro languages
Languages of Burkina Faso